Soundso is the third studio album by the German band Wir sind Helden. The first glimpse of this album could be caught when the band released the single "Endlich ein Grund zur Panik", which had a video clip featuring the band in superhero costumes. Before the album was released on 25 May 2007, a radio station from Munich played the whole album without permission, therefore revealing that the album was available as an illegal download before its release.

The first single, "Endlich ein Grund zur Panik", was featured on the soundtrack to FIFA 08.

Track listing

Standard Edition

French Edition
A French edition was also issued with the addition of 3 French versions and a slight reordering of the tracks as follows:

Chart performance

Album

Year-end

Singles

References

2007 albums
Wir sind Helden albums
German-language albums